Dinosaur Dreaming is a paleontological site situated near Inverloch, Victoria, Australia. Remains of primitive mammals from the Cretaceous Age were first uncovered there in 1997 by researchers from Museum Victoria and the Monash University Science Centre.

The remains of early mammals, dinosaurs, and fossil bones of Cretaceous Age reptiles, birds, and fishes can be found at the Inverloch dig site. Australia's first dinosaur bone, the Cape Paterson Claw, was discovered near Inverloch in 1903 by William Hamilton Ferguson.  The fossils at Inverloch date to the mid Cretaceous.

See also 
 Dinosaur Cove
 List of fossil sites (with link directory)

References

External links 
 Dinosaur Dreaming Web Site
 Dinosaur Dreaming in Action
 Monash Science Centre
 Museum Victoria Dinosaur Dreaming

 

Tourist attractions in Victoria (Australia)
Paleontology in Victoria
Cretaceous paleontological sites of Australia
Fossil parks in Australia
1991 in paleontology